Marco Rosenzweig (born 15 January 1996) is a German footballer who plays as a defender for TSV Buchbach.

References

External links
 

1996 births
Living people
Sportspeople from Bayreuth
German footballers
Association football defenders
SpVgg Unterhaching players
3. Liga players
Footballers from Bavaria
SpVgg Unterhaching II players
TSV Buchbach players